Washington Township is one of thirteen townships in Tippecanoe County, Indiana, United States. As of the 2010 census, its population was 2,432 and it contained 1,002 housing units.

Geography

Unincorporated communities
 Americus at 
 Buck Creek at 
 Colburn at 
 Delp at 
(This list is based on USGS data and may include former settlements.)

Adjacent townships
 Tippecanoe Township, Carroll County (north)
 Deer Creek Township, Carroll County (northeast)
 Madison Township, Carroll County (east)
 Clay Township, Carroll County (southeast)
 Perry Township (south)
 Fairfield Township (southwest)
 Tippecanoe Township (west)

Cemeteries
The township contains these four cemeteries: Americus, Cunningham, Hollywood and North Union.

Major highways
  Indiana State Road 25

School districts
 Tippecanoe School Corporation

Political districts
 Indiana's 4th congressional district
 State House District 41
 State Senate District 07

References

 United States Census Bureau 2007 TIGER/Line Shapefiles
 United States Board on Geographic Names (GNIS)
 United States National Atlas

External links
 Indiana Township Association
 United Township Association of Indiana

Townships in Tippecanoe County, Indiana
Lafayette metropolitan area, Indiana
Townships in Indiana